Qaim Khani is one of the neighbourhoods of SITE Town in Karachi, Sindh, Pakistan.

Qaimkhani or Kaimkhani (also spelled Qaim Khani and Kaim Khani) is a Muslim community that claims to be Muslim Rajputs. They converted to Islam in the 14th century.

References

External links 
 Karachi website.
 Local Government Sindh.

Neighbourhoods of Karachi
SITE Town